1001 Nights, also known as Sharaz, is a 1968 film directed by José María Elorrieta and starring Raf Vallone and Luciana Paluzzi.

References

External links 
 
 Sharaz at BFI

1968 films
1960s English-language films
English-language Italian films
English-language Spanish films
1960s Italian-language films
1960s Spanish-language films
Films produced by Sidney W. Pink
1960s multilingual films
Italian multilingual films
Spanish multilingual films
1960s Spanish films